The Grozny-City Towers is a five-star skyscraper hotel and business centre complex located near the Akhmad Kadyrov Mosque in Grozny, Chechnya.

2013 fire
On April 3, 2013, the Grozny-City Towers Facade Clocks in Grozny, Chechnya, Russia caught fire and one side of the 40-story building was engulfed in flames. No one was injured or killed in the blaze.  More than 100 firefighters and 16 fire engines fought the blaze.  The building known locally as "Olympus" housed a 5 star luxury hotel and an apartment belonging to French film star and French tax exile Gérard Depardieu, whose apartment was on the 27th floor facing the "Heart of Grozny."

Design
The architectural design belongs to Deniz Ceyhun Baykan and Structural design was done by Yüksel Konkan.

See also
 List of tallest buildings in Europe

References

Buildings and structures in Grozny
Towers in Russia
Hotels in Russia